S.M.K. Convent Bukit Nanas (abbreviated CBN) is an all-girls school located at Bukit Nanas, Kuala Lumpur, Malaysia. Established in 1899, it is one of the oldest schools in Malaysia and is widely known as CBN. Convent Bukit Nanas is one of the first schools to be distinguished as a Cluster School of Excellence by the Malaysian Ministry of Education. CBN has a close relationship with her brother school, St John's Institution, which is located along the same road and is also a Cluster School of Excellence. It is one of the 30 convent secondary schools in Malaysia. 

On 16 December 2008, Pos Malaysia issued a premium set of four commemorative stamps and first-day cover, honouring four Premier Schools of Malaysia - Convent Bukit Nanas and Victoria Institution in Kuala Lumpur, SMK St. Thomas in Kuching and SMK All Saints in Sabah for their superiority in academics, sports,and extra-curricular activities.

History
In 1899, three Sisters of the Congregation of the Holy Infant Jesus stepped off a steamship anchored at Port Swettenham.  Reverend Mother St Levine, accompanied by Sisters St Sabine and St Madeleine, had come on a mission to establish a school in Kuala Lumpur. The first convent school was located in Nonya Ah Yok's garden shed, and the Sisters lived on the first floor of her country house by the River Gombak on Ampang Road. The site is directly opposi,te Bukit Nanas. On 1 March 1899, the fee-paying Convent School in Kuala Lumpur officially opened with a dozen children. Many of the early pupils were children of immigrants working on the railway lines. By the second year there were 60 day pupils  and the sisters were operating an  orphanage on the site.

To the rescue came Towkay Ngee sui who gave temporary residence to the Sisters and the children at his house in Semenyih. He also approached the Government for approval to start a lottery to enable the Sisters to buy Victoria Hotel in Brickfields. Towkay Goh, as one of the benefactors of the convent, continued to help the Sisters, even providing a carriage and pony for their grocery shopping. On 15 January 1901, Victoria Hotel - once the venue of annual general meetings of the United Planters' Association - became home to Reverend Mother St. André, 17 sisters, 60 orphans and a school for 22 boarders and 100 day pupils. There was also a creche for 12 babies. Word of the Sisters' good work spread, and increasing numbers of pupils crammed the school. By 1911, there were 308 children, prompting the Inspector of Schools to recommend that new classrooms be built.

Timeline

1899 The first principal, Reverend Mother St. Levine, was murdered. The murderer was found dead in mysterious circumstances and police considered it as a murder-suicide. 

1900 The death of a day pupil was noted in the Diary. 'The school closed at half past one to allow the children to go home and get ready for the funeral on 24 January. In December, the Federal Inspector of Schools congratulated the Sisters on the 'efficient state of the school' adding that he would be recommending the maximum grant for the convent.

1902
5 November - The Inspector of Schools FMS, J. Driver, approved the syllabi for Hygiene and Geography.
11 December - The Acting British Resident  visited the convent and its grounds to inspect the 'ruins of inundation'.

1904 The pupils wore a convent uniform for the first time - a blue skirt and white blouse, sewn by Sisters Lawrence and Marie. Some boys left for the newly opened St. John's Institution.

1907 The school got its first grand piano, donated by Milly O'Hara Music lessons introduced by Rev Mother St. Augustin. Rev Mother St André, after a recuperative period in France, was transferred to Taiping Convent.

1909
The Inspector of Schools in his report noted that the Infant class was well supplied with kindergarten material. The lower Elementary classes used writing books with double lines, and the 'writing' in consequence was better'. F. A. Vanrenen also noted that 'pains was being taken with the pronunciation and the reading throughout was most satisfactory. Composition of Standard IV was fair'. He recommended that each student in the Higher Elementary Standards be provided with an atlas or map of reference for the Geography lesson. (The Inspector of Schools made frequent visits to the Convent School - in March, May and September)

1911 Mother St Matilde, revered founder of the HIJ Missions in Malaya, Singapore and Japan dies in Yokohama.

1912
2 December - Convent Bukit Nanas, or "The Top" as it came to be called,  by the Sisters was opened officially by Edward Lewis Brockman, Chief Secretary to Government. E.L. Brockman said in his opening address that he felt confident of the Sister's ability to raise the $26,000 that would be required to pay for the school building and extension. Their benefactors knew that the money would be 'well lid out' for besides 'offering a sound education to children of all classes and creeds, the sisters cared for orphans of whom there were 108 in the convent at the present time.

1915 - 1924
Chapel built; blessed by Monsignor Barillon on 27 September, it would be a sacred place of prayer and reflection for generations of students. CBN gets electricity. Visit by Mother General St. Marguerite Mary, paying tribute to the convent's benefactor, Goh Ah Ngee, at the event officiated by Chief Secretary W E Maxwell. CBN's 25th Anniversary. Celebrations postponed until a year later.  700 pupils at the time.

World War II (1941-1945)
The Japanese landed in Kota Bahru on 8 December 1941. Penang was bombarded by 85 Japanese dive bombers on 12 December. Kuala Lumpur was occupied on 13 January 1942, and Singapore fell to the Japanese on 11 February 1942. The Convent Bukit Nanas became a temporary sanctuary for hundreds of civilian refugees, and a home for even more orphans and abandoned babies. The Sisters grew vegetables on two acres in Kajang, drew water from a well in the courtyard, and looked after 400 refugees throughout the Japanese Occupation. Thirty-three Holy Infant Jesus Sisters of Malaya and Singapore died during the War. The Sisters continued writing their Annals entries.

The end of war 1945

8 May The Sisters received confirmation of rumours that Germany had surrendered unconditionally to the Allied forces.
28 August Graduation ceremony of the last group of Sisters in the Shihan Gakko.
15 September Convent Bukit Nanas re-opened.

1945 - 1965 After the Japanese Occupation, Rev Mother Adele returned CBN to its original state with the help of the British Military Administration (BMA). The Nazareth Building, formerly the house of the Chief Justice, became part of the school; this addition was granted by the Government. Rev Mother Pauline became headmistress and introduced physical education (PE) to the school. Science was introduced as part of the curriculum.  The art hall and laboratories were built and economics was added to the curriculum. The primary school and secondary school were separated. Form 6 classes began. The Form 4 block of classes was built. Rev Mother Aidan became headmistress and the four Houses were formed. The Houses took the names of current and previous headmistresses: Aidan (Red), Pauline (Blue), Adele (Yellow), and Xavier (Green).

1973 -2008 The school's Parents-Teachers Association (PTA) was established. Mrs Chee Phui Lay became the school's first layperson Principal. Sister Anne started the Counseling Program. The school office moved to a new location close to the Upper Secondary School. Bahasa Malaysia became the medium for study and instruction for all subjects. "The Facade" painted to commemorate the school's 85th anniversary. Both primary and secondary schools celebrated CBN's 100th anniversary and the school band was founded. Featured as one of four Premier Schools in commemorative stamps.

Location
On top of a hill once planted with pineapple and coffee, and only a stone's throw from St. John's Institution and Cathedral, the site at Bukit Nanas was the location to start the convent. The Sisters bought the land for $40,000 and sold the old convent property in Brickfields Road to the Government for $60,000. The new convent building cost another $26,000. The shortfall was paid for with contributions from the public.

Architecture
English Gothic architecture

 The Nazareth
Built around 1898, this house has undergone several transformations. Once the house of the Chief Justice, 'Nazareth' was requisitioned during the Japanese Occupation as the Domestic Science School for Girls. With the rapid increase in enrolment, there was a shortage of trained teachers in the country. In 1957, the Sisters acquired Nazareth to house a Teacher's Training College. In the 12 years, Nazareth provided over 300 teachers who fanned out to teach not only at Convent Bukit Nanas but at 50 Convents situated in all parts of the Peninsula. After 1970, Nazareth became the Sixth Form Wing of Convent Bukit Nanas.

Academics and curriculum

CBN comprises a secondary school and two primary schools. Administration of the secondary and primary schools separated in 1958.  CBN has classes from Form 1 through to Form 5 for girls aged 13 to 17. Girls enter CBN after they have completed their primary education in SRK Convent Bukit Nanas School I and School II (Malay: Sekolah Rendah Kebangsaan Convent Bukit Nanas). These primary schools have classes from Year 1 through Year 6 for girls aged 7 to 12.

The CBN secondary school administers two national Malaysian exams, the PT3 (Pentaksiran Tingkatan 3), and SPM (Sijil Pelajaran Malaysia. PT3 is taken by students at the Form 3 level to determine placement into Science, Art or Commerce courses. However, most girls leave CBN after they complete the SPM at Form 5 to pursue other pre-university courses like the A-Levels. As a result, SPM is seen as the most important exam of most Malaysian high school students careers.

CBN has constantly been among the top three performing schools for SPM in Kuala Lumpur, according to the Malaysian Ministry of Education. In 2010, CBN emerged as the top performing school in Kuala Lumpur for SPM. Each year, only a small number of students receive straight A's. As a result, this is a highly coveted honour. Convent Bukit Nanas receives a large amount of national media attention on results day.

Reverend mothers and principals
Reverend Mother St Levine February 1899-March 1899Reverend Mother St Augustin 1900-1911Reverend Mother St Tarcisius 1911-1923Reverend Mother St Adele 1923-1951Reverend Mother St Pauline 1951-1957Reverend Mother St Francis Xavier 1957-1965Reverend Mother St Aidan 1965-1966Reverend Mother St Brede 1966-1976Mrs. Chee Phui Lay 1976-1979Mrs. Indrani Manuel 1979-1993Mrs. Vimala Matthews 1993-1999Mrs. Alice George 1999-2004Mrs. Ann Khoo 2004-2011Mrs. Mystrical Rose Fernandez 2011-2014Mrs. Nirmala SS Nathan 2014-2017Mrs. Rosmand A. Lawrence 2017 

The continued rapid annual increase in enrollment at CBN necessitated change. The primary and secondary schools became separate entities in 1958. Nine years later, it was again time for reorganisation. In 1967, the secondary school came under a separate administration. CBN continued with the practice of having Sister Superiors as coordinators of the various aspects of the convent.Sister St. Aida, Sister Superior 1967-1969Sister St. Lawrence, Sister Superior 1969-1974Sister St. Therese Barra, Sister Superior 1974-1978CBN continued with the tradition of teaching Sisters who included Sister Bernadette, Sister Dorothy O Keeffe, Sister Bernadine Singleton, Sister Claire Wee, Sister M. Michael, Sister Angele Sih, Sister James Netto and Sister Fidelis.

The convent creed
The School Badge The school badge of the convent is an international one used by students on five continents - in places as far apart as Bolivia, France, Peru, Italy, Singapore, Spain, England, Ireland, Japan, Thailand and Malaysia. The center of the badge is red with a silver band fringed with gold. Red traditionally conveys the message of love, God's Spirit of Love embracing the world. On the right is the Holy Book. To the Christians, this is the Bible; to the Muslims, the Quran; to the Hindus the Bhagavadgita; to the Buddhists, the Dharmapada. On the left are the Distaff and Spindle. This is the symbol of labor.

School song
The school song is sung with the accompaniment of a piano. The music score was composed by Lee Swee Yin. 

English versionCBN"The shining star of my lifeYou will always glow within meAnd through me you will shine forthA new light others will follow."CBN"With us your memory will stayYou will always light the wayShow us our strengths and our hopes,CBN, our star forever more.So hear our song sung with spirits strongWe, the girls of CBN todayWill lift up our motto and strive to beSimple in virtue, steadfast in dutySo hear our song sung with spirits strongWe the girls of CBN todayThe youth of tomorrow, we promise to be trueFor CBN, we love you."- English Lyrics by Eileen LauMalay VersionCBNSinar bintang hidupkuBercahaya di sanubariSering bergemerlapanPancar sinar untuk semua.CBNIngatan'kan bersemiKerana kau penyuluh hidupTunjukkan harapan teguhCBN, bintang abadiku.Dengarlah suara semangat wajaKami insan CBN kiniTeruskan cita dan usahaTulus dengan fadilah, azam dengan baktiDengarlah suara semangat wajaKami insan CBN kiniBakal pemudi harapan negaraKerana CBN kau tercinta. Bahasa Malaysia lyrics by Puteri Zalina

Cheerleading (Xavier)

CBN's senior cheer leading team, Xavier, was established in the year 2000. In the years after that, the popularity of cheer leading in Malaysia and in CBN has grown exponentially. Girls undergo a rigorous training and selection process before being officially initiated in the squad. Xavier performs during sports day, school competitions and upon invitation to showcasing events. Every year, the highlight of Xavier is to compete in the National Cheer Competitions of Malaysia. Xavier has won a slew of awards including but not restricted to Champion, First-runner up, Second-Runner-up and Best Showmanship.

Xavier maintains a friendly rivalry with premier cheer leading squads like Cyren's from Sri Kuala Lumpur. Xavier's cheer leading outfit is a trademark green, gold and black. Xavier's cheerleading endeavours are a significant source of pride for the school and it draws out plenty of school spirit. CBN's Xavier supporters have won the Best Supporter award on multiple occasions. A number of Xavier's cheer leaders have gone on to cheer professionally in the Cheerleading Association and Register of Malaysia.

The Old Girls' Association
Originally called the Past Pupils Association, the first meeting was on Saturday 12 June 1951. About 140 old girls elected Mrs T.H. Ho as the President, Mrs D. Martin as Vice-President, Miss Yvonne Pun as Secretary and Miss Cho Seen Chok as Treasurer. Their first activity was the organization of the Mammoth Fun Fair on 4 August 1951 to raise funds for the Science Laboratory and Domestic Science Class. Somewhat defunct now as an Association, individual Old Girls now help the School in their personal capacity. Thereby continuing the tradition of steadfast duty to Convent Bukit Nanas.

School magazine
The school magazine, Marguerite, is published annually. The first edition was published in 1968.

The Centenary Book
The Centenary Book is the culmination of many months of research. The Centenary Book Committee were motivated to produce this Centenary Book as a tribute to the Sisters and Teachers who taught them to read and appreciate poetry, to reason and to count their blessings. For the Sisters and the Teachers, the Committee turned to libraries and archives to uncover information that would help place the School in its proper historical perspective. The Committee wrote, faxed, and telephoned hundreds of Old Girls (alumnae) - from Hong Kong to Australia to England to the United States of America - asking them to cull schoolgirl photographs from their albums.

The Board of Governors of Convent Bukit Nanas Secondary School
(Lembaga Pengelola Sekolah Menengah Convent Bukit Nanas)

With Merdeka, there came a major overhaul of the education system. School boards were introduced, following the recommendation of the Razak Report of 1956. They were given extensive powers; such as hiring and firing of teachers, supervision of school finances and administration of Mission Property. The Board comprised three representatives each from the Mission, parent body and the local education office and past students. While the new Boards worked to safeguard Mission interests, they represented a radical change from the traditional administration model under which the Reverend Mother Principal had full control, answerable to her Provincial and the local Education Officer. 

Chairpersons
1958-1966: Rev Mother Francis Xavier
1966-1976: Sister Denis
1976-1998: Sister Brede Forde
1998-present: Dr Indrani Manuel

Notable alumni

Adibah Noor- Singer, actress & social activist
Vanida Imran - Actress, model and television host.
Tuanku Aishah Rohani -Consort to the Yang di-Pertuan Besar of Negeri Sembilan, Tuanku Muhriz ibni Munawir
Raja Eleena - fourth child of the Sultan of Perak, Sultan Azlan Shah and a lawyer with her own legal firm in Kuala Lumpur
Dr Farrah Hani Imran -Head of Plastic Surgeon at UKM and former national rhythmic gymnast.
Tengku Permaisuri Norashikin -Tengku Permaisuri of Selangor and  consort of the 9th Sultan of Selangor, Sultan Sharafuddin Idris Shah
Datuk Nor Shamsiah Mohd Yunus -Governor of the Central Bank of Malaysia
Poh Ling Yeow - Malaysian-born Australian cook, artist, actress, author and television presenter.
Rafidah Aziz - Minister of International Trade and Industry from 1987 to 2008.
Tunku Puan Zanariah -Sultanah of Johor and Raja Permaisuri Agong VIII.
Ambiga Sreenevasan - Lawyer and human rights advocate
Low Ngai Yuen - Actor, film, and theatre director
Zabrina Fernandez- television producer and director
Moi Meng Ling - Professor, the University of Tokyo, virologist

References

Secondary schools in Malaysia
Girls' schools in Malaysia
Convent of the Holy Infant Jesus schools
Educational institutions established in 1899
1899 establishments in British Malaya
Publicly funded schools in Malaysia
Women in Kuala Lumpur